Thailand obtained internet access in 1996, the third country in Southeast Asia to do so. In 2019, About 50,9% of the population has access to the internet. According to a survey by Ookla in April 2021, Thailand also has the seventh fastest fixed internet speed at 206.81 Mbit/s behind Singapore, South Korea, Hong Kong, Monaco, Romania and Denmark.

The majority of broadband internet access uses Asymmetric Digital Subscriber Line (ADSL) and VDSL. Some areas are covered by cable modems (using Docsis), G.shdsl and fibre to the home (FTTH). Consumer broadband internet bandwidth ranges from 10 Mbit/s to 300 Mbit/s (Up to 1 Gbit/s in Bangkok, Chiang Mai, Pattaya, Phuket). Medium and large businesses use leased lines or Ethernet Internet/MPLS where fiber optic cables link many office buildings in the central business district areas such as Bangkok's Sukhumvit, Silom, and Sathorn areas to the Thailand internet backbone. Universities have access to fast internet access, including the Trans-Eurasia Information Network (TEIN2) research network.

A 3G UMTS/HSDPA network was launched in Bangkok and vicinity in December 2009 with speeds up to 7.2 Mbit/s on the 2100 MHz band. In late-2011, Telephone Organization of Thailand released 3G on HSPA+ technology covering all areas in Bangkok with speeds up to 42 Mbit/s. Major mobile network operators in Thailand also have released their 3G services at around the same time on the 850 MHz and 900 MHz bands with the same technology and connection speed.  FTTH with speeds up to 1 Gbit/s is available in limited areas in major cities, including Bangkok, Phuket, and Chiang Mai. 5G Cellular services were offered by AIS and True Move starting in 2020.

Thailand saw a rapid growth in the number of broadband users in 2005 with the initiation of unmetered broadband in 2004. There are 3,399,000 (2012) internet hosts in Thailand, the highest in Southeast Asia.

Thais spend an average of 16 hours on the internet per week.

As of now Thailand is able to provide 5G internet in its country.

Internet domain names
 Country code top-level Domain (ccTLD): .th
 Second Level Domains
 .ac for academic institutions
 .co for commercial companies
 .in for individuals or any others (from 2002)
 .go for governmental organizations
 .mi for military organizations
 .or for registered non-profit organizations
 .net for officially registered internet service providers

Internet backbones

International and domestic bandwidth 

, Thailand had 12,317,648 Mbit/s international bandwidth and 8,666,005 Mbit/s domestic bandwidth.

Demand for international bandwidth has increased dramatically due to the popularity of social networking services such as YouTube, Twitter, Facebook and increased number of broadband internet subscribers.

International gateways (IP transit)
There are 10 international internet gateway operators in Thailand.

True Corporation and Shin Corporation were granted Type II International Internet Gateway and Internet Exchange Service Licenses from the NTC (National Telecommunication Committee) in 2005. CAT Telecom holds the largest share of the market.

Domestic Internet eXchange
There are 11 domestic Internet exchange points in Thailand.

 Advance Datanetwork Communication National Internet Exchange (ADC-NIX)
 BB Connect National Internet Exchange by BB Connect (BBConnect-NIX)
 CS Loxinfo National Internet Exchange (CSL-NIX)
 Symphony National Internet Exchange (Symphony-NIX)
 Super Broadband Network (SBN) Internet Exchange (SBN-NIX)
 TCCT National Internet Exchange by TCC Technology (TCCT-NIX)
 TOT National Internet Exchange by TOT (TOT-NIX)
 True Internet Gateway National Internet Exchange (TIG-NIX)
 JasTel National Internet Exchange (JASTEL-NIX)
 NECTEC IIR Public Internet Exchange (PIE, Research Only)

Internet eXchange point
Thailand Internet Exchange or Thailand IX (Also Known As: CAT-NIX)
 Symphony Internet Exchange (SYMC-IX)
Bangkok Neutral Internet eXchange (BKNIX)
BBIX Thailand
Before 2003, IIR Public Internet Exchange was the largest internet exchange point in Thailand. As of August 2003, it is mandatory for all ISPs to have a presence in the National Internet Exchange (CAT-NIX) operated by CAT Telecom. CAT-NIX, TIG-NIX, TOT-NIX and TTGN-NIX are primary internet exchanges used by commercial internet service providers. Later, CAT-NIX rebranded itself to Thailand IX and invited international internet players to join its IX. Currently, Thailand IX is the largest internet eXchange point in Thailand with more than 250 Gbit/s bandwidth. Links between different internet exchanges are now set up, reducing domestic bandwidth costs.

The IIR Public Internet Exchange is now maintained by NECTEC and is used only for academic and research purposes. The only commercial internet service provider connected to the IIR Public Internet Exchange is Internet Thailand.

Internet service providers
Rights to operate as an internet service provider in Thailand are granted by the NTC (National Telecommunications Council).

Most broadband internet access in Thailand is offered via ADSL technology. Before 2002, broadband internet access was offered at more than 25,000 baht per month for a typical speed of 256 kbit/s. In 2002, TOT sparked a low-cost broadband internet war that caused rapid growth in broadband internet demands and has changed the way all the ISPs operate. With a ground-breaking price for an unlimited 256 kbit/s, TOT gained popularity among online gamers in Thailand. However, TOT was unable to provide services to the majority of people in Bangkok due to the fact that half of the fixed line telephone system was operated by Telecom Asia Co.,Ltd (now known as True Corporation) under a concession. At the same time, Asia InfoNet started its own ADSL service with a "free online game airtime" strategy since they also operate Ragnarok Online, the most famous online game at that time. Outside of Bangkok, TT&T teamed up with CAT Telecom to provide unlimited 2 Mbit/s ADSL service after three months of operation.

It is commonly believed that the popularity of online gaming at that time sparked the demand for broadband internet in Thailand.

Most broadband internet users in Thailand complain about the ISPs not being able to provide the speeds they promised. Many internet service providers have high contention ratios on home ADSL packages, sometimes up to 1:50. There was also limited international bandwidth due to CAT Telecom being the sole provider of an international internet gateway, but this has improved since the liberalization of internet gateway operations in 2005. At that time, most ISPs focused on expanding their domestic connections to accommodate online gaming demands. This led to a comeback of premium ADSL packages at a higher price for premium home users and corporate customers. Many users still argue that these packages will still not improve the international bandwidth availability for home users. Internet service providers are usually also criticized for throttling BitTorrent traffic.

Recently, there were dramatic increases in international bandwidth after the NTC authorized more ISPs to set up their own international internet gateways to cope with the growth in demand for contents requiring higher bandwidth.

In early-2009, Jasmine International launched ADSL services under the "3BB" brand in major cities offering speeds up to 3 Mbit/s for 590 baht. This prompted True Internet to expand their services to 8 Mbit/s from 5 Mbit/s and match 3BB prices.

In mid-2009, 3BB offered minimum speed 4 Mbit/s for 590 baht and expanded their services from 8 Mbit/s to 10 Mbit/s 1,490 baht per month, prompting True Internet to temporarily offer free upgrades for current 8 Mbit/s users to 12 Mbit/s. All of Maxnet's customers were also transferred to 3BB as part of the TT&T debt rehabilitation plan proposed by the debt holders. As of October 2009, True offers speeds up to 16 Mbit/s.

TOT and ADC have a local loop unbundling agreement allowing for ADC to provide ADSL services on TOT phone lines. Since most telephone wires in major cities are still on poles and not underground, there is no limit to how many phone lines can enter a building. This has prompted many ISPs to offer DSL services without phone service. A new wire is simply run to the premises requiring the service, bypassing the need for any further local loop unbundling agreements.

Despite the improvement of the internet in Thailand, there are still network issues, mostly concerning network latency. The delay on the network itself proved to be deleterious to competitive online gaming. Players claimed to have network issues which lost them games.

Wired

Wireless

Note: For 3G, only CAT, Hutch, TOT and its MVNOs are considered as legally commercial service. In 2012, the National Broadcasting and Telecommunications Commission (NBTC) held an auction and approved 2100 MHz licenses to three operators (Advanced Wireless Network of Advanced Info Service (AIS), DTAC Network of Total Access Communication (DTAC), and Real Future of True Corp) and 3G service under 2100 MHz is expected to operate by Q2 of 2013.

Internet data centers 

This section lists the commercial internet data centers (IDC) in Thailand.

Internet censorship 

Thailand is on Reporters Without Borders list of countries under surveillance in 2011. Thailand's Internet Freedom status is rated "Not Free" in the Freedom on the Net 2011 report by Freedom House, which cites substantial political censorship and the arrests of bloggers and other online users.

The national constitution provides for freedom of thought, speech and press "under many conditions" but the government seriously restricts these rights. The lese-majeste law criminalizes expression insulting the Thai king, punishable by fifteen years' imprisonment.

Estimates put the number of websites blocked at over 110,000 and growing in 2010. It is estimated that the Thai government spends 1.7 million baht per day on digital surveillance.

Single Internet gateway
The cabinet under Gen Prayut Chan-o-cha, the junta leader and prime minister, on 30 June 2015 gave a green light to Thailand's Ministry of Information and Communication Technology (MICT) and relevant agencies to move forward with plans to implement a Thai single gateway internet before the end of the 2015 fiscal budget. The plan to reduce internet gateways was initially proposed by Pol Gen Somyot Poompanmoung, the chief of the Royal Thai Police, as a single gateway system makes it easier for state authorities to monitor, filter, delete, and intercept information on the internet that the authorities deem inappropriate. Currently (2015), there are about 10 international internet gateway operators in Thailand. The MICT has been ordered to report the progress on the plan to the cabinet before the end of September 2015.

Critics point out that from a "...systems point of view, having a single gateway and a single point of failure is a bad idea." They go on to say that, "The people of Thailand can kiss a fast internet goodbye purely from technical incompetence, not to mention all the monitoring, censoring and deep packet inspection the military want. Would VPN and encryption be outlawed? That would be a logical next step."

On 30 September 2015, Thai netizens expressed their opposition to the single gateway plan by launching DDoS attacks against government websites, thereby bringing the websites down for hours. Those who joined the attacks referred to their action as a civil disobedience. But they were threatened with years in jail by Thai police. Hundreds of thousands of people have also signed a petition against the single gateway plan. Despite heavy opposition, Thai authorities said they still push ahead with the plan.

Internet surveillance
According to the NGO Privacy International in a September 2016 report, "The Thai military government has counted on its police force to monitor online speech in order to curb dissent. But beyond the police force itself, the ruling military government has empowered networks of citizens whom it encourages to denounce those who post online content considered contrary to government policies." Following the May 2014 coup led by General Prayut, there was a sharp increase in online surveillance carried out by the National Council for Peace and Order (NCPO), the ruling junta. An updated Computer Crime Act in 2014 gave police broad powers to monitor online commentary, particularly social networking applications such as Facebook. In the two years since the coup, 527 people have been arrested, 167 tried in military court, and 68 charged with lèse majesté. Conviction on a charge of lèse majesté can carry a jail sentence of up to 15 years. Of the 68 cases in which people have been charged, 21 involved content posted on Facebook.

The "Cyber Scout" program was originally established in 2010 by the Thai Ministry of Justice and the Ministry of Information and Communication Technology (MICT)—since renamed the Ministry of Digital Economy and Society. The program became moribund shortly thereafter, but was revived by the NCPO following their coup d'etat. The aim of the Cyber Scouts is to encourage the "ethical and responsible use of information and communication technology" among youngsters and to create a network of young volunteers to monitor online content that could be deemed a threat to national security and the monarchy.

In December 2016, the junta-appointed Thai National Legislative Assembly (NLA) passed an amendment to the 2007 Computer Crime Act that has been called, "...a grab bag of the worst provisions of the worst internet laws in the world, bits of the UK's Snooper's Charter, America's Computer Fraud and Abuse Act, and the dregs of many other failed laws." Thai officials claim the changes  protect people's rights from being violated on social and digital media while enhancing the digital economy. In a Bangkok Post editorial urging that the NLA reject the amendment, it noted that, "When the government first set out to revise the Computer Crime Act last year, it pledged that the change will not violate people's rights and freedoms. The resulting draft amendment shows anything but an attempt to maintain the promise. The NLA must vote it down." It passed unanimously.

See also
 Internet censorship in Thailand
 Media of Thailand
 Telecommunications in Thailand
 Internet rush hour
 Thaimail

References

Further reading
 Pinkaew Laungaramsri. (2016). Mass surveillance and the militarization of cyberspace in post-coup Thailand. ASEAS – Austrian Journal of South-East Asian Studies, 9(2), 195–214.

External links

 
Telecommunications in Thailand